The Cameroon  Swimming and Life Saving Federation, is the national governing body for the sport of swimming in Cameroon.

References

National members of the African Swimming Confederation
Swimming
Swimming in Cameroon